Turbonilla nodoscalare is a species of sea snail, a marine gastropod mollusk in the family Pyramidellidae, the pyrams and their allies.

Description
The shell grows to a length of 2.4 mm.

Distribution
This species occurs in the Pacific Ocean off the Solomons.

References

External links
 To Encyclopedia of Life
 To World Register of Marine Species

nodoscalare
Gastropods described in 2010